Gaëtan Llorach (born 16 January 1974 in Saint-Martin-d'Hères, Isère, France) is a former French alpine skier who competed in the 2002 Winter Olympics.

External links

References

1974 births
Living people
French male alpine skiers
Olympic alpine skiers of France
Alpine skiers at the 2002 Winter Olympics
People from Saint-Martin-d'Hères
Sportspeople from Isère